Randy Slaugh (born October 3, 1987) is an American music producer and composer based in Salt Lake City, Utah. He has worked with artists such as Architects, Sleeping With Sirens, Skillet, The Amity Affliction, Periphery, Trace Cyrus, David Archuleta, TesseracT, Devin Townsend, and Four Year Strong, and is a member of Kscope's cross-continental music group White Moth Black Butterfly. In recent years, he has worked on music for television series on Netflix, CBS, NBC, ABC, Hulu, Discovery, ESPN, VH1, and MTV, for video games such as Free Fire, and for ad campaigns for Bombas, NBA, Levi's, and KMC Wheels. Slaugh is a voting member of The Recording Academy, Sundance Institute, The Society of Composers & Lyricists and the Heavy Music Awards.

Life and career

Early years
Randy Slaugh grew up in the suburb of Philadelphia, Pennsylvania playing music in alternative rock and post-hardcore bands. He began teaching himself audio production and later went on to study communication and advertising in college. While at college, Slaugh connected with audio engineer Ken Dudley and started learning more professional levels of production.

2010–present
In 2010, Slaugh connected with the band Periphery at some of their early shows. After hearing a demo of their song "Have a Blast," he reached out to lead guitarist and producer Misha Mansoor, and offered to record real violin and cello to replace the midi strings in the demo. In 2013, Slaugh worked with Misery Signals, who were recording their album Absent Light in Idaho and were looking for more extensive string arrangements to feature on the album. Later that year, he went on to work with I Killed the Prom Queen, Devin Townsend, Architects, We Shot the Moon, and Intervals. In 2015, Slaugh joined progressive pop group White Moth Black Butterfly after working with Daniel Tompkins and Keshav Dhar on Skyharbor's Guiding Lights album the previous year. He co-wrote and co-produced the group's album Atone, as well as their Rising Sun (EP), which were released via Kscope.

Devin Townsend's Z², which Slaugh did orchestration and engineering on, won Metal/Hard Music Album of the Year at the 2015 Juno Awards. Skyharbor's Guiding Lights was named Best Album: Critic's Choice in Rolling Stone's 2015 Metal Awards, and Architects' Lost Forever // Lost Together won Best Album in the Relentless Kerrang Awards. The song "The Price is Wrong" from Periphery's Periphery III: Select Difficulty was nominated for Best Metal Performance at the 2017 Grammy Awards. and Periphery's 2019 release Hail Stan charted #1 on Billboard's Independent Album, Current Rock Album and Current Hard Music Album charts.

In 2018, Slaugh broke into the TV and film world working on shows such as MTV's Catfish: The TV Show, VH1's Black Ink Crew, TLC's 90 Day Fiancé, Discovery's Diesel Brothers and A&E's Wahlburgers. He has since composed music for television series across several networks, and for movies including Bollywood film The Body and independent crime thriller Locker 42.

Selected discography

Television

Film

Video Games

References

External links
Randy Slaugh on AllMusic

1987 births
Living people
Record producers from Pennsylvania
American music arrangers
21st-century American composers